Meryeurus servillei is a species of beetle in the family Cerambycidae, the only species in the genus Meryeurus.

References

Ectenessini